Giovanni Orient (also Jean Orient; died 1503) was a Roman Catholic prelate who served as Bishop of Terralba (1484–1503).

Biography
Giovanni Orient was ordained a priest in the Order of Friars Minor. On 22 Sep 1484, he was appointed by Pope Sixtus IV as Bishop of Terralba. On 16 Jan 1485, he was consecrated by Pierre Fridaricus, Bishop of Nisyros. He served as Bishop of Terralba until his death in 1503.

References 

1503 deaths
15th-century Roman Catholic archbishops in the Kingdom of Aragon
Bishops appointed by Pope Sixtus IV
Franciscan bishops